The 2013 Copa del Rey Juvenil is the 63rd staging of the Copa del Rey Juvenil de Fútbol. The competition began on May 19, 2013 and will end on June 30, 2013 with the final.

First round

The top two teams from each group and the two best third-placed teams are drawn into a two-game best aggregate score series. The first leg began the week of May 18 and the return leg the week of May 25.

 

|}

Quarter-final
The eight winners from the first round advance to quarter-final for a two-game series best aggregate score with the first leg beginning the week of June 1 and returning the week of June 8.

|}

Semi-finals

The four winners play a two-game series best aggregate score beginning the week of June 15 and returning the week of June 22.

|}

Final

The semi-final winners play a one game final at Campo de Las Viñas in Vera, Almería the week of June 29.

Details

See also
2012–13 División de Honor Juvenil de Fútbol

References

Copa del Rey Juvenil de Fútbol
Juvenil